John Dale (fl. 1529) was an English politician.

He was a Member (MP) of the Parliament of England for Guildford in 1529. There are several men of this name from the time, but none definitively identified as the MP.

References

Year of birth missing
Year of death missing
English MPs 1529–1536